Marian Grzybowski (15 June 1895 in Chardzhou – 11 December 1949) was a Polish dermatologist. He authored more than 80 scientific publications. He first described a variant of keratoacanthoma, called today generalized eruptive keratoacanthoma of Grzybowski.

References
 Grzybowski A, Zaba R. Grzybowski's keratoacanthoma – the man behind the eponym. Med Sci Monit. 14. 7, p. MH1-3, 2008. .
 Grzybowski A. Polish dermatology in the 19th and the first half of the 20th centuries. Int J Dermatol. 47. 1, pp. 91–101, 2008. doi:10.1111/j.1365-4632.2007.03373.x. .
 Gliński JB. Słownik biograficzny lekarzy i farmaceutów - ofiar drugiej wojny światowej. Wrocław: Urban&Partner, 1997 pp. 126–128

Polish dermatologists
1895 births
1949 deaths